Jono Lance (born 27 June 1990) is a professional rugby union footballer who previously played for Western Force in the Super Rugby AU competition. He usually plays at full-back, fly-half or centre.

Early life
Lance was born  in Canberra, Australia.

Career
He made his debut during the 2011 Super Rugby season for the Queensland Reds against the Western Force in Perth. After three years at the Reds he signed with the NSW Waratahs on a two-year deal starting in the 2014 season.

Lance played in the National Rugby Championship for the New South Wales Country Eagles in 2015 before joining the Western Force for the 2016 season.

Following the axing of the Force from the Super Rugby competition from 2018 onwards, Lance signed a short-term deal with English Premiership side Worcester. During this time he also signed with the Melbourne Rebels joining fellow former Force players, Adam Coleman, Dane Haylett-Petty, Richard Hardwick & Bill Meakes.
When Lance returned to Australia, the Rebels released him to then sign with the Queensland Reds without making an appearance for the Melbourne franchise. Lance rejoined the Reds following another cocaine-related controversy for Wallaby Karmichael Hunt and head coach Brad Thorn's dismissal of 70-test Wallaby & fellow 2011 Premiership-winner Quade Cooper.

On 1 May 2020, it was announced Lance would travel to Scotland capital Edinburgh in the Pro14 from the 2020-21 season. But, his move to Edinburgh was called off due to failing to get a UK visa.

He has since joined Western Force for the newly formed Super Rugby AU season.

Super Rugby statistics

References

External links 
 Reds profile

1990 births
Australian rugby union players
Queensland Reds players
New South Wales Waratahs players
New South Wales Country Eagles players
Rugby union fullbacks
Rugby union centres
Rugby union players from Canberra
Living people
Australia international rugby sevens players
Rugby union fly-halves
Expatriate rugby union players in England
Australian expatriate rugby union players
Melbourne Rebels players
Western Force players
Perth Spirit players
Worcester Warriors players
Mie Honda Heat players
Expatriate rugby union players in Japan